Gender, Place & Culture: A Journal of Feminist Geography is a peer-reviewed journal published 12 times a year by Taylor & Francis. It is the leading international journal in feminist geography and it aims to provide "a forum for debate in human geography and related disciplines on theoretically-informed research concerned with gender issues".

The journal's Managing Editor as of 2021 is Lena Grip of Karlstad University.

Abstracting and indexing 

According to the Journal Citation Reports, the journal has a 2015 impact factor of 1.180, ranking it 13th out of 40 journals in the category "Women's Studies".

Controversy 

In 2018 the journal was the target of a scholarly publishing sting, in which a hoax paper titled "Human Reactions to Rape Culture and Queer Performativity in Urban Dog Parks in Portland, Oregon" was reviewed, accepted, and received an award. The paper proposed that men should be "trained like we do dogs to prevent rape culture". The article was retracted after the hoax was exposed.

See also 
 List of women's studies journals

References

English-language journals
Publications established in 1994
Routledge academic journals
Women's studies journals
Monthly journals